Gmina Aleksandrów may refer to either of the following administrative districts in Poland:
Gmina Aleksandrów, Łódź Voivodeship (central Poland)
Gmina Aleksandrów, Lublin Voivodeship (east Poland)

See also
Gmina Aleksandrów Kujawski
Gmina Aleksandrów Łódzki